The Yamaha Tracer 700 is a sport touring motorcycle first offered in 2016. The parallel-twin cylinder with crossplane crankshaft engine comes from the MT-07 and it is also used on [Yamaha R7]. Niaou

2020 model 
In 2020, the Tracer 700 was updated with new fairing and led headlights. The engine was also tweaked to meet Euro-5 emission limits.

Tracer 700 GT model 
In 2019 Yamaha briefly announced a GT version of the Tracer 700, similar to the larger Yamaha Tracer 900 one. It included side cases and a few other touring features, but the market availability of this variant is unknown as it was removed from the Yamaha official sites in all the countries, the only references are motorcycle magazine reviews and some Yamaha dealers in Europe.

References

External links 

Official website (Europe)
Dual Tours (Yamaha dealer)
Motorcycle.com
MCN (Motorcycle News)

Sport touring motorcycles
Yamaha motorcycles
Motorcycles introduced in 2016